The 2010 Puebla oil pipeline explosion was a large oil pipeline explosion that occurred at 5:50 am CST on December 19, 2010, in the city of San Martín Texmelucan de Labastida, Puebla, Mexico. The pipeline, running from Tabasco to Hidalgo, was owned by the Pemex petroleum company, and exploded after thieves from the Los Zetas drug cartel attempted to siphon off the oil. The gas explosion and resulting oil fire killed 29 people, including thirteen children, and injured 52. Some of the flames in the fire became ten metres high, and the smoke towered over the city. Firefighters eventually controlled the blaze, but electricity and water remained cut following the explosions, and the military was deployed to the site. Mexican President Felipe Calderón visited the explosion site on the day of the incident to offer condolences to the victims' families. The fire was one of the deadliest in Mexican history, largely destroying an area of five-kilometre radius, and some oil may have polluted the Atoyac River.

Background
The Los Zetas gang, one of the most powerful drug cartels and paramilitary groups involved in the ongoing Mexican Drug War, was blamed for the explosion. Throughout 2010, drug-related conflicts had killed 12,456 people. In 2008, Pemex reported 9.3 billion pesos ($750 million USD) of oil lost to thieves. Previously, close to sixty illegal tapping incidents occurred near the explosion site due to thieves stealing the oil. Much of the stolen oil is often trafficked to the United States.

Investigation
Felipe Calderón ordered an official investigation into the incident. A hole was found at the pipeline, and several bodies lay near the initial site of the explosion. The cause of the spark that led to the explosion is still unknown. The investigation is to include an assessment of the environmental impact of the explosion, including the pollution of downstream reservoirs. Mechanical failure was not ruled out as a possible cause of the oil leak despite evidence of theft and tampering of the pipeline. The pipeline was re-opened on December 22.

References

Oil spills in Mexico
Explosions in Mexico
Battles of the Mexican drug war
Organized crime events in Mexico
Pemex
Explosions in 2010
Mass murder in 2010
Puebla Oil Pipeline Explosion, 2010
Puebla Oil Pipeline Explosion, 2010
2010 in the environment
December 2010 events in Mexico
Petroleum industry in Mexico
Los Zetas